Chiriquí refers to one of the following, in or around Panama:

 Chiriquí Province, a province of Panama
 Chiriquí, Chiriquí, a corregimiento in Chiriquí Province
 Chiriquí River, a river in its eponymous province 
 Gulf of Chiriquí, a gulf in its eponymous province
 Chiriqui culture, a Pre-Columbian civilization that inhabited this province